S.O.S. Sahara is a 1938 German drama film directed by Jacques de Baroncelli and starring Charles Vanel, Jean-Pierre Aumont and Marta Labarr. The film was made in the French language,  produced by the French subsidiary of the German studio UFA. It was shot on location in Algeria. The screenplay was based on a play Men Without a Past by Jean Martet. Martet's credit was removed from the film during the Nazi occupation of France, and he later brought a court case against UFA establishing his rights to the film.

It was later remade in 1962 as Station Six-Sahara.

Cast
 Charles Vanel as Loup 
 Jean-Pierre Aumont as Paul Moutier  
 Marta Labarr as Hélène Muriel  
 Raymond Cordy as Charles 
 Paul Azaïs as Bobby  
 Andrée Lindia as Dolly  
 Nilda Duplessy as L'amie  
 René Dary as Delini  
 Georges Malkine as Ivan  
 Georges Lannes as Jacquard  
 Bill Bocket as Le policier 
 Hugues Wanner as L'employé

References

Bibliography 
 Bergfelder, Tim. International Adventures: German Popular Cinema and European Co-productions in the 1960s. Berghahn Books, 2005.
 Orlando, Valerie.  Screening Morocco: Contemporary Depictions in Film of a Changing Society. Ohio University Press, 2011.

External links 
 

1938 films
Films of Nazi Germany
German drama films
German black-and-white films
1938 drama films
1930s French-language films
Films directed by Jacques de Baroncelli
Films shot in Algeria
German films based on plays
Films set in deserts
UFA GmbH films
1930s German films